Cecropterus dorantes, the lilac-banded longtail or Dorantes longtail, is a species of butterfly in the family Hesperiidae. It is found from Argentina, north through Central America, Mexico, and the West Indies to southern Texas and peninsular Florida. Strays can be found as far north as northern California, southern Arizona, southern Missouri and North Carolina.

The wingspan is 37–51 mm. There are three to four generations throughout the year in southern Florida and southern Texas.

The larvae feed on various legumes, including wild and cultivated Phaseolus species, Desmodium and blue peas Clitoria. Adults feed on flower nectar from various plants, including shepherd's needle, lantana, trilisa, ironweed, and bougainvillea.

Subspecies
The following subspecies are recognised:
 Cecropterus dorantes dorantes (Texas, Mexico, Surinam, Brazil, Colombia, Venezuela)
 Cecropterus dorantes santiago (Brazil, Jamaica, Haiti, Venezuela, Cuba, Grenada)
 Cecropterus dorantes obscurus (Guadeloupe, Dominica, Martinique, Saba, Antigua, Grenada, Barbados)
 Cecropterus dorantes galapagensis (Galapagos)
 Cecropterus dorantes calafia (Mexico (Baja California))
 Cecropterus dorantes cramptoni (Antilles, Puerto Rico)

References

External links
Butterflies and Moths of North America
Bug Guide

Eudaminae
Butterflies of Central America
Butterflies of the Caribbean
Butterflies of North America
Hesperiidae of South America
Lepidoptera of the Caribbean
Lepidoptera of Brazil
Lepidoptera of Colombia
Lepidoptera of Ecuador
Lepidoptera of Venezuela
Fauna of the Amazon
Butterflies described in 1790